Egregore (also spelled egregor;) is an occult concept representing a non-physical entity that arises from the collective thoughts of a distinct group of people. Historically, the concept referred to angelic beings, or watchers, and the specific rituals and practices associated with them, namely within Enochian traditions.

In more recent times, the concept has referred to a psychic manifestation, or a thoughtform, which occurs when any group shares a common motivation—being made up of, and influencing, the thoughts of the group.

History 
The concept of egregorial powers has its roots in the Book of Enoch.

Later the term and concept found its way into other languages. Manuscrit trouvé à Saragosse, or The Manuscript Found in Saragossa, was a novel written in French by the Polish author Count Jan Potocki (1761–1815) in the Russian Empire in the early 19th century which features the term 'egregores', referring to "the most illustrious of fallen angels."

The term 'egregore' was also used by the French author Victor Hugo, in La Légende des siècles (1859) ("The Legend of the Ages"), where he uses the word égrégore first as an adjective, then as a noun, while leaving the meaning obscure.

Éliphas Lévi, in Le Grand Arcane ("The Great Secret", 1868) identifies 'egregors' with the tradition concerning the Watchers, the fathers of the nephilim, describing them as "terrible beings" that "crush us without pity because they are unaware of our existence."

Another concept of the egregore is the GOTOS (Gradus Ordinis Templi Orientis Saturni (33°)) of the Fraternitas Saturni.

Contemporary usage 
A 1987 article by Gaetan Delaforge in Gnosis magazine defines an egregore as a kind of group mind that is created when people consciously come together for a common purpose.

Egregore is also used in relation to the Montreal Surrealists, best known as Les Automatistes, in Ray Ellenwood's Egregore: A History of the Montréal Automatist Movement.

Gary Lachman identifies Pepe the Frog as an egregore in his book Dark Star Rising.

See also

References

Citations

Works cited

Primary sources

Secondary sources

Further reading

External links 
 

Fraternitas Saturni
Language and mysticism
Occult collective consciousness